Raffles may refer to:

People
Sir Stamford Raffles (1781–1826), British statesman, Lieutenant Governor of Java and founder of Singapore in 1819
Thomas Raffles (1788–1863), English Congregational minister
Frank Boucher (1901–1977), Canadian ice hockey player and executive nicknamed "Raffles"

Schools
Raffles Girls' Primary School, an all-girls primary school in Singapore
Raffles Girls' School, an all-girls secondary school in Singapore
Raffles Institution, a pre-tertiary educational institution in Singapore
Raffles Junior College, the formerly independent junior college affiliate of Raffles Institution
National University of Singapore, formerly known as Raffles College
Raffles University, Neemrana, Rajasthan, India
Raffles International Christian School, a school in Indonesia

Business
Raffles City Singapore, a shopping mall
Raffles City Shanghai, China
Raffles City Chongqing, China
Raffles Hotel in Singapore, named after Stamford Raffles
Raffles Hotels & Resorts, a chain of luxury hotels
Fairmont Raffles Hotels International, a hotel management company and owner of the Raffles Hotel
Raffles (cigarette), a cigarette brand made by Philip Morris

Fiction
A. J. Raffles, a fictional gentleman thief in a series of books by E. W. Hornung
Raffles (1930 film), a sound adaption starring Ronald Colman
Raffles (1939 film), another adaptation, starring David Niven
Raffles (1958 film)
Raffles (TV series), a 1977 television adaptation starring Anthony Valentine
Raffles (Lord Lister), a fictional German pulp hero originally with similarities to A. J. Raffles
Raffles Haw, an 1891 fictional character in a moralistic story by A. Conan Doyle
"Raffles", an episode of the British sitcom Hi-de-Hi!

Places
Raffles, Cumbria, a suburb of Carlisle, United Kingdom
Raffles Bay, Northern Territory, Australia
Raffles Island, Semersooq, Greenland

Other uses
The plural of raffle, a game of chance involving numbered tickets
Raffles's malkoha (Rhinortha chlorophaea), a species of cuckoo 
Raffles (horse), a famous Arabian horse stallion
The Raffles Museum of Biodiversity Research, at the National University of Singapore
Raffles (video game), a 1991 video game released on Atari ST and Amiga
Raffles v Wichelhaus [1864] EWHC Exch J19, a leading case on mutual mistake in English contract law